Mihaela Ignatova is a Bulgarian mathematician who won the 2020 Sadosky Prize of the Association for Women in Mathematics for her research in mathematical analysis, and in particular in partial differential equations and fluid dynamics.

Education and career
Ignatova earned both a bachelor's degree from Sofia University and a master's degree from the University of Nantes in 2004, and a second master's degree from Sofia University in 2006, working under the supervision of Emil Horozov. She then became a graduate student at the University of Southern California, and completed her Ph.D. there in 2011. Her dissertation was Quantitative unique continuation and complexity of solutions to partial differential equations and her doctoral advisor was Igor Kukavica.

After working as a visiting assistant professor at the University of California, Riverside, a postdoctoral researcher at Stanford University, and an instructor at Princeton University, she moved to Temple University as an assistant professor in 2018.

References

External links
Home page

Year of birth missing (living people)
Living people
Bulgarian mathematicians
Bulgarian women mathematicians
Mathematical analysts
Sofia University alumni
University of Nantes alumni
University of Southern California alumni
Temple University faculty